Cerrillos State Forest is one of the 21 state forests in Puerto Rico. The forest has several trails, observation areas, several picnic areas, complete with gazeebos and a man-made reservoir, Lake Cerrillos and the Lake Cerrillos dam.

Location
The forest is located at 18.08842 N, 66.58058 W, in barrio Maragüez, which is located northeast of the city of Ponce, Puerto Rico. It can be reached via PR-139 Km 3.4. Its elevation varies from 400 to 1,000 feet above sea level.

Recreation
Recreational activities permitted in this forest include fishing, hiking, kayaking, photography, picnicking, scientific research, and bird watching.

Gallery

See also

 List of Puerto Rico state forests
 List of National Natural Landmarks in Puerto Rico
 Cerro de Punta
 Porta Caribe

References

Further reading
 Puerto Rico Statewide Assessment and Strategies for Forest Resources. Government of Puerto Rico. Department of Natural and Environmental Resources. (n.d.; ca. 2011) 171 pages. 
Puerto Rico Statewide Assessment and Strategies for Forest Resources. Government of Puerto Rico. Department of Natural and Environmental Resources. (n.d.; ca. 2011) 100 pages.
Guide to the Ecological Systems of Puerto Rico. Gary L. Miller and Ariel E. Lugo. United States Department of Agriculture Forest Service. International Institute of Tropical Forestry. General Technical Report IITF-GTR-35. June 2009.
 Gould, W.A.; Alarcón, C.; Fevold, B.; Jiménez, M.E.; Martinuzzi, S.; Potts, G.; Solórzano, M.; Ventosa, E. Puerto Rico Gap Analysis Project–final report. Moscow, ID: U.S. Geological Survey, and Río Piedras, PR: U.S. Department of Agriculture, Forest Service, International Institute of Tropical Forestry. 159 pages and 8 appendices. 2007.

Tourist attractions in Ponce, Puerto Rico
Puerto Rico state forests
Geography of Ponce, Puerto Rico
1996 establishments in Puerto Rico
Protected areas established in 1996